Herman Edvard Cederberg (7 September 1883 – 30 January 1969) was a Finnish swimmer, who competed at the 1908 and the 1912 Summer Olympics.

Swimming

Olympics

National 
He won some Finnish championships in swimming:
 100 metre freestyle: 1906, 1907
 1000 metre freestyle: 1906
 200 metre breaststroke: 1906, 1907
 100 metre life saving: 1908, 1912
 4 × 50 metre freestyle relay: 1908

References

External links
 

1883 births
1969 deaths
Finnish male backstroke swimmers
Olympic swimmers of Finland
Swimmers at the 1908 Summer Olympics
Swimmers at the 1912 Summer Olympics
People from Korsholm
Finnish male breaststroke swimmers
Sportspeople from Ostrobothnia (region)